{{DISPLAYTITLE:Prostaglandin EP3 receptor}}

Prostaglandin EP3 receptor (53kDa), also known as EP3, is a prostaglandin receptor for prostaglandin E2 (PGE2) encoded by the human gene PTGER3; it is one of four identified EP receptors, the others being EP1, EP2, and EP4, all of which bind with and mediate cellular responses to PGE2 and also, but generally with lesser affinity and responsiveness, certain other prostanoids (see Prostaglandin receptors). EP has been implicated in various physiological and pathological responses.

Gene 
The PTGER3 gene is located on human chromosome 1 at position p31.1 (i.e. 1p31.1), contains 10 exons, and codes for a G protein coupled receptor (GPCR) of the rhodopsin-like receptor family, Subfamily A14 (see rhodopsin-like receptors#Subfamily A14). PTGER3 codes for at least 8 different isoforms in humans, i.e. PTGER3-1 to PGGER3-8 (i.e., EP3-1, EP3-2, EP3-3, EP3-4, EP3-5, EP3-6, EP3-7, and EP3-8), while Ptger3 codes for at least 3 isoforms in mice, Ptger1-Ptger3 (i.e. Ep3-α, Ep3-β, and Ep3-γ). These isoforms are variants made by Alternative splicing conducted at the 5'-end of DNA to form proteins that vary at or near their C-terminus. Since these isoforms different in their tissue expressions as well as the signaling pathways which they activate, they may vary in the functions that they perform. Further studies are needed to examine functional differences among these isoforms.

Expression 
EP3 is widely distributed in humans. Its protein and/or mRNA is expressed in kidney (i.e. glomeruli, Tamm-Horsfall protein negative late distal convoluted tubules, connecting segments, cortical and medullary collecting ducts, media and endothelial cells of arteries and arterioles); stomach (vascular smooth muscle and gastric fundus mucosal cells); thalamus (anterior, ventromedial, laterodorsal, paraventricular and central medial nuclei); intestinal mucosal epithelia at the apex of crypts; myometrium (stromal cells, endothelial cells, and, in pregnancy, placenta, chorion, and amnion); mouth gingival fibroblasts; and eye (corneal endothelium and keratocytes, trabecular cells, ciliary epithelium, and conjunctival and iridal stroma cells, and retinal Müller cells).

Ligands

Activating ligands
Standard prostanoids have the following relative efficacies in binding to and activating EP3: PGE2>PGF2α=PGI2>PGD2=TXA2. Prostaglandin E1 (PGE1), which has one less double bond than PGE2, has the same binding affinity and potency for EP3 as PGE2. PGE2 has extreme high affinity (dissociation constant Kd=0.3 nM) for EP3. Several synthetic compounds, e.g. sulprostone, SC-46275, MB-28767, and ONO-AE-248, bind to and stimulate with high potency EP3 but unlike PGE2 have the advantage of being highly selective for this receptor over other EP receptors and are relatively resistant to being metabolically degraded. They are in development as drugs for the potential treatment of stomach ulcers in humans.

Inhibiting ligands
Numerous synthetic compounds have been found to be highly selective in binding to but not stimulating EP3. These Receptor antagonist DG-O41, L798,106, and ONO-AE3-240, block EP3 from responding to PGE2 or other agonists of this receptor, including Sulprostone, ONO-AE-248 and TEI-3356.  They are in development primarily as anti-thrombotics, i.e. drugs to treat pathological blood clotting in humans.

Mechanism of cell activation
EP3 is classified as an inhibitory type of prostanoid receptor based on its ability, upon activation, to inhibit the activation of adenylyl cyclase stimulated by relaxant types of prostanoid receptors viz., prostaglandin DP, E2, and E4 receptors (see Prostaglandin receptors). When initially bound to PGE2 or other of its agonists, it mobilizes G proteins containing various types of G proteins, depending upon the particular EP3 isoform: EP3α and EP3β isoforms activate Gi alpha subunit (i.e. Gαi)-G beta-gamma complexes (i.e. Gαi)-Gβγ) complexes) as well as Gα12-Gβγ complexes while the EP3γ isoform activates in addition to and the  Gαi- Gβγ complexes Gαi- Gβγ complexes. (G protein linkages for the other EP3 isoforms have not been defined.) In consequence, complexes dissociate into Gαi, Gα12, Gs and Gβγ components which proceed to activate cell signaling pathways that lead functional responses viz., pathways that activate phospholipase C to convert cellular phospholipids to diacylglycerol which promotes the activation of certain isoforms of protein kinase C, pathways that elevated cellular cytosolic Ca2+ which thereby regulate Ca2+-sensitive cell signaling molecules, and pathways that inhibit adenylyl cyclase which thereby lowers cellular levels of cyclic adenosine monophosphate (cAMP) to reduce the activity of cAMP-dependent signaling molecules.

Functions
Studies using animals genetically engineered to lack EP3 and supplemented by studies examining the actions of EP3 receptor antagonists and agonists in animals as well as animal and human tissues indicate that this receptor serves various functions. However, an EP3 receptor function found in these studies does not necessarily indicate that in does do in humans. For example, EP3 receptor activation promotes duodenal secretion in mice; this function is mediated by EP4 receptor activation in humans. EP receptor functions can vary with species and most of the functional studies cited here have not translated their animal and tissue models to humans.

Digestive system 
Activation of EP3 and EP4 receptors in mice stimulates this secretion but in humans activation of EP4, not EP3, appears responsible for this secretion. These two prostanoid receptors also stimulate intestinal mucous secretion, a function which may also act to reduce acidic damage to the duodenum.

Fever 
EP3-deficient mice as well as mice selectively deleted of EP3 expression in the brain's median preoptic nucleus fail to develop fever in response to endotoxins (i.e. bacteria-derived lipopolysaccharide) or the host-derived regulator of body temperature, IL-1β. The ability of endotoxins and IL-1β but not that of PGE2 to trigger fever is blocked by inhibitors of nitric oxide and PG2. EP3-deficient mice exhibit normal febrile responses to stress, interleukin-8, and macrophage inflammatory protein-1beta (MIP-1β). It is suggested that these findings indicate that a) activation of the EP3 receptor suppresses the inhibitory tone that the preoptic hypothalamus has on thermogenic effector cells in the brain; b) endotoxin and IL-1β simulate the production of nitric oxide which in turn causes the production of PGE2 and thereby the EP3-dependent fever-producing; c) other factors such as stress, interleukin 8, and MIP-1β trigger fever independently of EP3; and d) inhibition of the PGE2-EP3 pathway underlies the ability of aspirin and other Nonsteroidal anti-inflammatory drugs to reduce fever caused by inflammation in animals and, possibly, humans.

Allergy 
In a mouse model of ovalbumin-induced asthma, a selective EP3 agonist reduced airway cellularity, mucus, and bronchoconstriction responses to methacholine. In this model, EP3-deficient mice, upon ovalbumin challenge, exhibited worsened allergic inflammation as measured by increased airway eosinophils, neutrophils, lymphocytes, and pro-allergic cytokines (i.e. interleukin 4, interleukin 5, and interleukin 13) as compared to wild type mice. EP3 receptor-deficient mice and/or wild type mice treated with an EP3 receptor agonist are similarly protected from allergic responses in models of allergic conjunctivitis and contact hypersensitivity. Thus, EP3 appears to serve an important role in reducing allergic reactivity at least in mice.

Cough 
Studies with mice, guinea pig, and human tissues and in guinea pigs indicate that PGE2 operates through EP3 to trigger cough responses. Its mechanism of action involves activation and/or sensitization of TRPV1 (as well as TRPA1) receptors, presumably by an indirect mechanism. Genetic polymorphism  in the EP3 receptor (rs11209716), has been associated with ACE inhibitor-induce cough in humans. The use of EP3 receptor antagonists may warrant study for the treatment of chronic cough in humans.

Blood pressure 
Activation of EP3 receptors contracts vascular beds including rat mesentery artery, rat tail artery, guinea-pig aorta, rodent and human pulmonary artery, and murine renal and brain vasculature. Mice depleted of EP3  are partially protected from brain injury consequential to experimentally induced cerebral ischemia. Furthermore, rodent studies indicate that agonist-induced activation of EP3 in the brain by intra-cerebroventricular injection of PGE2 or selective EP3 agonist cause hypertension; a highly selective EP3 receptor antagonist blocked this PGE2-induced response. These studies, which examine a sympatho-excitatory response (i.e. responses wherein brain excitation such as stroke raises blood pressure) suggest that certain hypertension responses in humans are mediated, at least in part, by EP3.

Vascular permeability 
Model studies indicate that PG2 (but not specific antigens or IgE cross-linkage) stimulates mouse and human mast cells to release histamine by an EP3-dependent mechanism. Furthermore, EP3-deficient mice fail to develop increased capillary permeability and tissue swelling in response to EP3 receptor agonists and the metabolic precursor to PGE2, arachidonic acid. It is suggested, based on these and other less direct studies, that PGE2-EP3 signaling may be responsible for the skin swelling and edema provoked by topical 5-aminolaevulinic acid photodynamic therapy, contact with chemical irritants, infection with pathogens, and various skin disorders in humans.

Blood clotting 
Activation of EP3 receptors on the blood platelets of mice, monkeys, and humans enhances their aggregation, degranulation, and blood clot-promoting responsiveness to a wide array of physiological (e.g. thrombin) and pathological (e.g. atheromatous plaques. (In contrast, activation of either the EP2 or EP3 receptor inhibits platelet activation) Inhibition of EP3 with the selective EP3 receptor antagonist, DG-041, has been shown to prevent blood clotting but not to alter hemostasis or blood loss in mice and in inhibit platelet activation responses in human whole blood while not prolonging bleeding times when given to human volunteers. The drug has been proposed to be of potential clinical use for the prevention of blood clotting while causing little or no bleeding tendencies.

Pain 
EP3 deficient mice exhibit significant reductions in: hyperalgesic writhing (i.e. squirming) responses to acetic acid administration; acute but not chronic Herpes simplex infection-induced pain; and HIV-1 Envelope glycoprotein GP120 intrathecal injection-induced tactile allodynia. Furthermore, a selective EP3 agonist, ONO-AE-248, induces hyperalgesia pain in wild type but not EP3-deficient mice. While pain perception is a complex phenomenon involving multiple causes and multiple receptors including EP2, EP1, LTB4, bradykinin, nerve growth factor, and other receptors, these studies indicate that EP3 receptors contribute to the perception of at least certain types of pain in mice and may also do so in humans.

Cancer 
Studies of the direct effects of EP3 receptor activation on cancer in animal and tissue models give contradictory results suggesting that this receptor does not play an important role in Carcinogenesis. However, some studies suggest an indirect pro-carcinogenic function for the EP3 receptor: The growth and metastasis of implanted Lewis lung carcinoma cells, a mouse lung cancer cell line, is suppressed in EP3 receptor deficient mice. This effect was associated with a reduction in the levels of Vascular endothelial growth factor and matrix metalloproteinase-9 expression in the tumor's stroma; expression of the pro-lymphangiogenic growth factor VEGF-C and its receptor, VEGFR3; and a tumor-associated angiogenesis and lymphangiogenesis.

Clinical significance

Therapeutics 
Many drugs that act on EP3 and, often, other prostaglandin receptors, are in clinical use. A partial list of these includes: 
Misoprostol, an EP3 and EP4 receptor agonist, is in clinical use to prevent ulcers, to induce labor in pregnancy, medical abortion, and late miscarriage, and to prevent and treat postpartum bleeding (see Misoprostol). 
Sulprostone, relatively selective EP3 receptor agonist with a weak ability to stimulate the EP1 receptor is in clinical use for inducing medical abortion and ending pregnancy after fetal death (see Sulprostone). 
Iloprost activates EP2, EP3, and EP4 receptors; it is in clinical use to treat diseases involving pathological constriction of blood vessels such as pulmonary hypertension, Raynauds disease, and scleroderma. Presumably, Iloprost works by stimulating EP2, and EP4 receptors which have vasodilation actions.

Other drugs are in various stages of clinical development or have been proposed to be tested for clinical development. A sampling of these includes:
Enprostil, which binds to and activates primarily the EP3 receptor, was found in a prospective multicenter randomized controlled trial conducted in Japan to significantly improve the effects of cimetidine in treating gastric ulcer. It is considered to be an efficient and safe treatment for gastric and duodenal ulcers.  
ONO-9054 (Sepetoprost), a dual an EP3/Prostaglandin F receptor agonist, is in phase 1 clinical trial studies for the treatment of ocular hypertension and open-angle glaucoma.
DG-041, a highly selective EP3 antagonist, has been proposed to warrant further study as anti-thrombosis agent.  
GR 63799X, MB-28767, ONO-AE-248, and TEI-3356 are putative EP3 receptor-selective agonists that have been proposed to warrant further study to treat and/or prevent various types of cardiovascular diseases.

Genomic studies 
The single nucleotide polymorphism (SNP) in the PTGER3, rs977214 A/G variant has been associated with an increase in pre-term births in two populations of European ancestry; the SNP variant -1709T>A in PTGER3 has been associated with aspirin-exacerbated respiratory disease in a Korean population; and 6 SNP variants have been associated with development of the Steven Johnson syndrome and its more severe form, toxic epidermal necrolysis, in a Japanese population.

See also 
 Eicosanoid receptor
 Prostaglandin E2 receptor 1 (EP1)
 Prostaglandin E2 receptor 2 (EP2)
 Prostaglandin E2 receptor 4 (EP4)

References

Further reading

External links 
 

G protein-coupled receptors